See Döpe is a lake in the Nordwestmecklenburg district in Mecklenburg-Vorpommern, Germany. At an elevation of 38 m, its surface area is 0.77 km².

Dope
Nature reserves in Mecklenburg-Western Pomerania